Chromis limbaughi is a Chromis from the Eastern Central Pacific. It occasionally makes its way into the aquarium trade. It grows to a size of 10 cm in length. The specific name honours the zoologist and diver Conrad Limbaugh (1925-1960) who collected some specimens and was the first to photograph this species.

References

External links
 

limbaughi
Fish described in 1825